Mehmet Lütfi Budak, Haja Muhammed Lütfi Effendi, or His Holiness Alvarlı Efe (or Efe from Alvar) (1868-1956), as it is commonly said among the people, is a Turkish imam, sufi and poet. He is a sheikh in the Naqshbandi and Qadiri Sufi orders.

Life 

He was born in Kındigi (Altınbaşak) village of Pasinler (Hasankale) district of Erzurum. According to official records his date of birth is 1854, according to his son Hacı Seyfeddin Effendi, when he was born in 1868. His father is Haja Hüseyin Effendi and his mother is Hatice Hanım. He is a Sayyid from the maternal lineage, which is related to the Prophet Muhammad. He started to work as an imam in Sivaslı Mosque in Hasankale in 1890. In the same year, he visited Naqshbandi Sheikh Muhammad Kufrawi, who resided in Bitlis with his father, for the first time. Five years later, he received the Naqshbandi caliphate from Muhammad Kufrawi. The spiritual chain is as follows: Muhammad Kufrawi - Sayyid Taha Haqqari - Mawlana Khalid Baghdadi. In addition, he was in Tillo and received a licence to teach in the Qadiri Sufi order from Sheikh Nur Hamza.

During World War I, he was an imam in the village of Dinarkom when the Russian occupation began in Erzurum in 1916. He was not given permission by the army he applied to fight in person. However, when the atrocities of some minority groups increased while he was the imam of the mosque in Yavi village of Tercan, he participated in the war with the militia he formed from the villagers despite his advancing age. When the war ended and the Russian occupation was over, he started to work as an imam in the village of Alvar in Hasankale. He resided here until 1939. Imam Ramiz Effendi, who succeeded him when he left Alvar, is the father of Fethullah Gülen. Gülen states that Efe from Alvar died while he was attending his Sufi lodge, and he was 16 years old at that time. After the end of World War II, he went on pilgrimage at the first opportunity. He made three pilgrimages in 1947, 1949 and 1950. He was married five times throughout his life. Of his sons, only Haji Seyfeddin Effendi lived after his demise. He died in Erzurum on March 12, 1956. His grave is in Alvar.

In addition to his mother tongue Turkish, Muhammed Lüfti Effendi knew Arabic, Persian and Kurdish enough to write poetry. He composed poems in Sufi poetry. After his death, his poems were published by his son under the name of Hulasat'ul-Hakayık (The Summary of Truths).

References

External links 

 A builder of spirituality: Muhammed Lütfi Efendi, the Imam of Alvar
 Poems from Anatolia

1868 births
1956 deaths
Turkish Sufis
Sufi poets
20th-century imams
Asian imams
Naqshbandi order
Qadiri order
Turkish male poets
20th-century Turkish poets
People from Pasinler
People from Erzincan
Turkish militia officers
Ottoman people of World War I